Live at Tonic 2001 is a double album by Masada featuring two sets recorded live at Tonic during one evening in New York's Lower East Side.

Reception
The Allmusic review by Thom Jurek awarded the album 4½ stars, stating: <p>Live at Tonic is perhaps the most revealing and astonishing record yet by Masada, because it was recorded before a very discriminating audience of enthusiasts not only in the band's hometown, but also in its home club.

Track listing 
All compositions by John Zorn
 Disc one
 "Intro" - 1:23
 "Karaim" - 17:50
 "Ner Tamid" - 5:07
 "Acharei Mot" - 11:07
 "Kisofim" - 7:12
 "Jachin" - 6:30
 "Malkhut" - 4:52
 "Nashim" - 6:38
 Disc two
 "Intro" - 0:30
 "Lilin" - 14:43
 "Khebar" - 5:59
 "Galshan" - 5:35
 "Malkhut" - 4:49
 "Shevet" - 8:08
 "Shamor" - 7:40
 "Acharei Mot" - 10:27
 "Kisofim" - 8:35
 "Shechem" - 14:06
Recorded live at Tonic, New York City on June 16, 2001

Personnel 
Masada
 John Zorn - saxophone
 Dave Douglas - trumpet
 Greg Cohen - bass
 Joey Baron - drums

Notes 
 Produced by John Zorn in association with Kazunori Sugiyama
 Published by THEATER OF MUSICAL OPTICS
 Mastered by Allan Tucker
 Designed by Heung-Heung Chin

References 

Albums produced by John Zorn
Masada (band) albums
John Zorn live albums
2001 live albums
Tzadik Records live albums